Hammerwatch is a 2013 hack and slash and action-adventure game developed and published by Swedish studio Crackshell. It was released for Linux, Microsoft Windows and OS X in August 2013, followed by released for Nintendo Switch, PlayStation 4 and Xbox One in December 2017. It also has the sequel Heroes of Hammerwatch.

Gameplay 
The gameplay of the game is similar to Diablo and other hack and slash video games. The player is in a castle and must kill hundreds of enemies. Like in the first edition of Diablo, there are no skill trees in Hammerwatch. The player buys skills from traders across the maps. Hammerwatch has six character classes: paladin, wizard, ranger, thief, warlock and priest.

Development 
The game was developed by Jochum Skoglund and Niklas Myrberg. It was mainly inspired by the Gauntlet games.
The game was put on Steam Greenlight and was accepted on 17 April 2013. A first beta was released in February 2013.

The game was released on 12 August 2013 on Steam and the DRM-free store gog.com.

Expansion 
An expansion for Hammerwatch, called Temple of the Sun, was released on 16 September 2014. It was released for free, as a patch. It contains a new campaign that takes place in the desert. It adds new themes, bosses and challenges.

Reception 

Hammerwatch received a score of 75/100 on GameFront and a score of 7/10 on Destructoid. Hammerwatch has an average rating of 72 out of 100 at Metacritic, based on 5 critic reviews. It had 2,500 pre-orders and sold 12,000 units on the first 24 hours on Steam.

The game was in the top 30 of the most anticipated indie games of 2013 on Destructoid.

References

External links 
 
 

2013 video games
Action-adventure games
Indie video games
Cooperative video games
PlayStation 4 games
Steam Greenlight games
Video games developed in Sweden
Windows games
Linux games
MacOS games
Video games with Steam Workshop support
Xbox One games
Nintendo Switch games
Multiplayer and single-player video games
Video games set in castles